is a male Japanese Taekwondo practitioner. He won the bronze medal in the men's lightweight division (-72 kg) at the 2005 World Taekwondo Championships held in Madrid, Spain.

External links
 Profile and information from The-Sports.org

1974 births
Living people
Japanese male taekwondo practitioners
World Taekwondo Championships medalists
21st-century Japanese people